Dolenci may refer to:

 Dolenci, Slovenia, a village in Prekmurje, Slovenia
 Dolenci, Croatia, a village near Vrbovsko, Croatia
 Dolenci, Demir Hisar, a village in Demir Hisar municipality, Republic of Macedonia
 Dolenci, Bitola, a village in Bitola Municipality, Republic of Macedonia